DNA replication licensing factor MCM4 is a protein that in humans is encoded by the MCM4 gene.

Function 

The protein encoded by this gene is one of the highly conserved mini-chromosome maintenance proteins (MCM) that are essential for the initiation of eukaryotic genome replication. The hexameric protein complex formed by MCM proteins is a key component of the pre-replication complex (pre-RC) and may be involved in the formation of replication forks and in the recruitment of other DNA replication related proteins. The MCM complex consisting of this protein and MCM2, 6 and 7 proteins possesses DNA helicase activity, and may act as a DNA unwinding enzyme. The phosphorylation of this protein by CDC2 kinase reduces the DNA helicase activity and chromatin binding of the MCM complex. This gene is mapped to a region on the chromosome 8 head-to-head next to the PRKDC/DNA-PK, a DNA-activated protein kinase involved in the repair of DNA double-strand breaks. Alternatively spliced transcript variants encoding the same protein have been reported.

See also 
Mini Chromosome Maintenance

Interactions 

MCM4 has been shown to interact with:

 Cell division cycle 7-related protein kinase, 
 MCM2, 
 MCM6, 
 MCM7, 
 ORC1L, 
 ORC2L, 
 ORC3L, 
 ORC4L, 
 ORC5L, 
 ORC6L, and
 Replication protein A1.

References

Further reading